Cadell Ramsey (born 27 March 1997), better known by his stage name GHSTLY XXVII and formerly as Ghostly, is an English grime MC and producer from Acton, West London. He has appeared on BBC Radio 1Xtra, as well as pirate radio stations such as Deja Vu FM, Mode FM and Rinse FM.

Career
In 2012, Ghostly appeared on SBTV along with Novelist, Koder and Tempo for a cypher at just age 15 and began to accumulate an interest around his name in the grime scene. 2013 Ghostly started going back and forth with Elf Kid from The Square sending war dubs due to altercations about a clash that was supposed to take place. At 17 years old, the young MC then went on to clash the entire Square Crew on Flex FM, a pirate / online radio station based in South London. In 2014, Ghostly was extremely active on the pirate radio scene amongst others and was part of a new breed of MCs bringing back that raw grime energy on the airwaves that were somewhat abandoned as well as gaining further exposure on major radio stations by appearing on Rinse FM, BBC 1xtra and more very frequently. 2015 was the year the explosive tracks "Slap Yourself" and "DALYDK" both premiered by DJ Cable's "Sixty Minutes" mix, which was broadcast on MistaJam's BBC 1Xtra taken from his debut Recon EP released via Complex Magazine on 10 August. Since the beginning of 2015, Ghostly has been extremely active on the pirate radio circuit as well as performing his underground music all over the UK in raves and festivals. He is now also a producer and record label owner at Duppi.

In March 2017, he released a four-track EP entitled Guerrilla Tactics through Flowdan's SpentShell label. The project features guest vocals from PK and Riko Dan as well as productions from AudioSlugs, J Beatz and Kid D.

Discography

EPs

Singles

References

External links

Musicians from London
Grime music artists
English record producers
1997 births
Living people
People from Acton, London
Rappers from London